Mikołaj Mściwy (d. 1526) was a Roman Catholic prelate who served as Auxiliary Bishop of Gniezno (1509–?).

Biography
On 1 Apr 1509, Nicolaus Msczny was appointed during the papacy of Pope Julius II as Auxiliary Bishop of Gniezno and Titular Bishop of Athyra. It is uncertain how long he served as Auxiliary Bishop of Gniezno. While bishop, he was the principal co-consecrator of Jakub von Salza, Bishop of Wrocław (1521).

References 

16th-century Roman Catholic bishops in Poland
Bishops appointed by Pope Julius II
1526 deaths